Herman Diedrich Spöring Sr. (or Spoering) (1701–1747) was a professor of Medicine at the Academy of Turku in Turku, Finland, and an amateur naturalist.

His son Herman Diedrich Spöring Jr. (1733–1771), a Finnish explorer and botanist, was one of the scientific personnel who accompanied James Cook on the 1768-71 HM Bark Endeavour expedition to the Pacific.

1701 births
1747 deaths
18th-century Finnish physicians
People from Turku
Members of the Royal Society of Sciences in Uppsala